Ziskin is a surname. Notable people with the surname include:

Laura Ziskin (1950–2011), American film producer
Trudy Ziskin (born 1946), American actor whose stage name is Trudi Ames

See also
Ziskind